This article contains the results of the Ireland team selected by the Football Association of Ireland. It was previously known as the Irish Free State. After a FIFA ruling they became the  Republic of Ireland in 1954.

1936

1937

1938

1939

1940-1945

1946

1947

1948

1949

1950

1951

1952

1953

1954

References

See also
 Irish Free State national football team - Results
 Republic of Ireland national football team - 1950s Results

1930s - 1950s
1935–36 in Irish association football
1936–37 in Irish association football
1937–38 in Irish association football
1938–39 in Irish association football
1939–40 in Irish association football
1945–46 in Irish association football
1946–47 in Irish association football
1947–48 in Irish association football
1948–49 in Irish association football
1949–50 in Irish association football
1950–51 in Republic of Ireland association football
1951–52 in Republic of Ireland association football
1952–53 in Republic of Ireland association football
1953–54 in Republic of Ireland association football